This is a list of rivers in Croatia.

Rivers longer than 50 km in Croatia

Rivers shorter than 50 km in Croatia

See also 
Geography of Croatia

Sources
 
 
 

Croatia
Rivers